Groser is a surname of English origin, meaning "wholesale dealer grocer". Notable people with the surname include:

John Groser (1890-1966), English priest and Christian socialist
Tim Groser (born 1950), New Zealand politician and diplomat

See also
Grosser